Time UK may refer to:

 Time UK, a manufacturer of PCs sold by Granville Technology Group
 Time UK (band), a 1980s rock band
 Time in the United Kingdom